Fanjakana is a town in Fianarantsoa Province in central Madagascar.

Populated places in Fianarantsoa Province